Lobularia maritima (syn. Alyssum maritimum) is a species of low-growing flowering plant in the family Brassicaceae.

Etymology
The genus name Lobularia comes from a Greek word meaning 'small pod', referring to the shape of the fruits. The name of the species maritima refers to its preferred coastal habitat.

Description
The stem is very branched, with dense clusters of small flowers. The leaves are 1–4 cm long and 3–5 mm, broad, alternate, sessile, quite hairy, oval to lanceolate, with an entire margin.

The six stamens have yellow anthers. The flowers are produced throughout the growing season, or year-round in areas free of frost. They are pollinated by insects (entomophily). The fruits are numerous elongated seedpods rather hairy, oval to rounded, each containing two seeds. The dispersal of seed is affected by the wind (anemochory).

Distribution
This plant is native to the Mediterranean Basin and the Macaronesia region: (Canary Islands, Madeira, Cape Verde). It is widely naturalized elsewhere in the temperate world, including the United States. There is an endemic subspecies in the local flora of the Columbretes Islands of the western Mediterranean.

Habitat

Cultivation
Lobularia maritima is cultivated in gardens, with many horticultural varieties with purple or pink flowers. The plant is best planted in early spring, but requires little maintenance when growing. Although an annual, it may reseed in temperate climates. It will flower more profusely if spent blooms are trimmed. It is also grown in cracks in paving and walls, and is especially associated with coastal locations. It prefers partial shade, and is resistant to heat and drought. Plants with darker-colored flowers do better in cooler temperatures. Lobularia maritima has high drought and heat resistance.

Cultivars
(Those marked  have gained the Royal Horticultural Society’s Award of Garden Merit.) 

 'Snow Cloth' (white)
 'Royal Carpet' (purple)
 'Benthamii' 
 'Carpet of Snow'
 'Easter Bonnet Violet'
 Golf Series  
 'Little Dorrit'
 'Navy Blue'
 'New Carpet of Snow'      
 'Oriental Nights'
 'Rosie O’Day'  
 'Snow Crystals'
 'Snowdrift'  
 'Sweet White'
'Tiny Tim'
 'Violet Queen'  
 'Wonderland Copper' 
 'Wonderland White'

Uses
The petals, leaves, and tender stems of the plant can be eaten raw or cooked.

Gallery

Synonyms

References

External links

Jepson Manual Treatment
USDA Plants Profile
Kemper Garden Center
Photo gallery

Annual plants
Brassicaceae
Edible plants
Flora of Macaronesia
Flora of Europe
Garden plants of Europe
Groundcovers
Plants described in 1753
Taxa named by Carl Linnaeus